The 2018 Capital Football season was the sixth season under the new competition format in the Australian Capital Territory. The league premier for the new structure qualifies for the National Premier Leagues finals series, competing with the other state federation premiers in a final knockout tournament to decide the National Premier Leagues Champion for 2018.

League Tables

2018 National Premier League ACT

The 2018 National Premier League ACT season was played over 18 rounds from  March to August 2018. The league ran with nine teams after the FFA cut funding to the FFA Centre of Excellence, which wound up following the conclusion of the 2017 season.

Finals

Top Scorers

Reference:

2018 ACT Capital League

The 2018 ACT Capital League is the sixth edition of the Capital League as the second level domestic association football competition in the ACT. There were 18 rounds in total with five matches contested per round. The season started on 7 April 2018 and ran until 12 August 2018.

Finals

2018 Capital Football Division 1

The 2018 ACT Capital Football Division 1 is the fourth edition of the Capital League Division 1 as the third level domestic association football competition in the ACT. The 2018 season consisted of 18 rounds with four matches played per round. The season started on 7 April 2018 and ran until 11 August 2018.

Finals

2018 Women's National Premier League ACT

The highest tier domestic football competition in the ACT is known as the ACT Women's National Premier League (WNPL). Each team played each other three times for a total of 21 rounds, plus a finals series for the top 4 teams.

Finals

Cup Competitions

2018 Federation Cup

2018 was the 56th edition of the Capital Football Federation Cup. The Federation cup acts as the preliminary rounds for the FFA Cup in the ACT with the Cup winner entering the subsequent FFA Cup round of 32. In 2018, the Federation Cup, which is open to all senior men's teams registered with Capital Football, consisted of two rounds, quarter-finals, semi-finals and a final. NPL clubs entered the tournament in the second round. The Cup ran from 18 March 2018 (first round) till 16 June 2018 (final). Canberra FC secured its 18th cup title and qualification to the 2018 FFA Cup with a 3–2 victory over Gungahlin with former Sydney FC player Kofi Danning scoring the winning goal at Woden Park.

Notes:
 † = After Extra Time

2018 Charity Shield

2018 was the third edition of the annual ACT Charity Shield contested to kick off the 2018 Capital Football season. Money raised from the event goes towards a nominated charity, which in 2018 was Ronald McDonald House Canberra. Canberra Olympic and Tuggeranong United contested the Shield in 2018. Olympic claimed its second consecutive Charity Shield title with a 3–1 victory.

See also

Soccer in the Australian Capital Territory
Sport in the Australian Capital Territory
2018 National Premier Leagues Capital Football Grand Final

References

Capital Football